Hussey College Warri is a secondary school located along Upper Erejuwa Road in Warri, Delta State, Nigeria. It is one of the oldest and most prestigious colleges in Delta State and Nigeria, having produced many notable figures in the Nigerian professional and political scenery. The school has literally raised several generations of Nigerians from all tribes and backgrounds and schooled them in the best tradition of scholarship, athleticism, citizenship and morality. The 60th anniversary celebration (Diamond Jubilee) of the foundation of Hussey College, Warri was organised by the Old Students Association in 2007.

Hussey College was named after Eric Robert James Hussey, the first British Director of Education in Nigeria and one time Olympic games competitor, he competed in the 1908 Summer Olympics.

Hussey College started as only boys’ secondary school (single-sex education) at inception in 1947. It became a mixed secondary school – boys and girls – (coeducation) in 1960 when the first set of girls were admitted. The school was reverted to only boys’ school in the early 2000s by the Delta State Government and was renamed “Hussey Boys Model College”.

History 
Hussey College was founded on 3 February 1947 as the first college in Warri by three Itsekiri personalities, Chief Ogbemi Newe Rewane, the late Ologbotsere of Warri, his brother Alfred Rewane and Chief Elliot Nekapenami Andrew Begho, the late Iserigho of Warri kingdom. Their aim was to establish a secondary school that would offer qualitative education to young men and women in Warri and beyond - Nigeria.

The motive of the founding fathers was to redress the vacuum situation following the relocation of Warri College, the then Government Secondary School in the city to Ughelli as Government College, Ughelli in 1946 and the founding of Urhobo College in Effurun (outskirt of Warri) by Urhobo Progressive Union (UPU) in 1946. It became pertinent and urgent for the need of a secondary to be sited in Warri to fill in the vacuum. Chief O. N Rewane and Begho filled this vacuum with the founding of Hussey College in Warri through private entrepreneurship.

The idea to establish a school was first mooted in 1935 by both men, then barely in their twenties, at the Government College, Ibadan where they were students. Rewane and Begho along with Mr V. A. Savages (B.A. Hons) did the spade work to ensure that the school became reality. At inception Rewane was treasurer, Begho the manager and Savage, the pioneer principal. They were educationists per excellence.

Hussey College Warri, from inception became cosmopolitan with students' intake across the length and breadth of Nigeria. It was a college of both academic and athletic excellence and the breeding ground of future leaders in various department of national life. Hussey College has established itself as the most distinguish and credible secondary school in Warri and Nigeria in general.

School Anthem 

Hussey College Anthem sums up the ideals of the founding fathers of the school.

Hussey College Anthem
Hussey College we are proud of you
You as our good mother has brought us up
To do thy good and refrain from bad
As good citizens we owe our thanks to thee
May God send His divine peace
To those who made the state
And pour His reign on them
That they may live to enjoy their work - Hussey College
We thy children always pray for thee
That anything which is good may come from thee
We thy children always pray for thee
That anything which is good may come from thee
UP HUSSEY!

School Houses 
Formerly, before the conversion of Hussey College into Hussey Boys Model College (only boys’ school), Hussey College used to have seven competitive houses: four boys’ houses and three girls’ houses.

The boys’ houses were:
 Dore (red)
 Ikoli (yellow)
 Nana (green)
 Seville Dawes (blue)

While the girls’ houses were:
 Ejimogho (yellow)
 Iye (red)
 Otsowode (blue)

The boys’ houses competed among fellow boys’ houses while the girls’ houses also competed among fellow girls’ houses. Unlike in other mixed schools where boys and girls share the same house name, Hussey College operated unisex houses. These houses competed for medals, laurels and points in the school annual inter-house sports (Hussey College Annual Inter-House Sports Competition) which pulled huge crowd from all over Warri and beyond – especially the invitation relay events, which was a delight to watch and highly talked about in town, usually added glamour to the inter-house sports.

During the school annual inter-house sports competition, Seville Dawes House often had the upper hand among the male houses, with its arch-rival being Dore House. However, in some years, dark horse like Ikoli House usually acted as giant killer to come first. And the minnow Nana House (with mother-luck on their side) usually pulled surprises in their rare few lucky years too.

While Otsowode House dominated the female houses, with her bitter arch-rival being Iye House, but in some years, Ejimogho - especially years she had elite talented athletes - usually bamboozled her way to clinch first spot.

While the rivalry between Seville Dawes and Dore – and other male houses – was mere healthy competition left behind on the athletic field, the rivalry between Otsowode and Iye – in extension Ejimogho – was bitter and often carried over to the classrooms.

Principals 
The roster of former principals and teachers of Hussey college could pass for a mini who is who in the polity. They were part the team that moulded and groomed future leaders and nurtured the institution into a centre of excellence. A bronze scroll containing the names of pioneer principals and early teachers as a tribute to their worthy contributions was unveiled during the 60th anniversary celebration of the school.
 Mr. V. A. Savages (B.A. Hons) - The pioneer principal.
 Eng. R. S. Mckenzie - The second principal.
 Mr. G.C. Pillai - Principal (1963–1965) appointed by Chief O.N. Rewane, Chemistry teacher (1961–1963)
 Chief E. A. Adeyemo - The first indigenous principal.
 Justice F. O. Awogu, Phd
 Mr. Amata
 Mr. Afam Mordi
 Mr. Igodan
 Mr. Godwin P. Alufohai
 Chief Michael Ojeifo Ojo – A popular principal in the 1980s.
 M. A. Usiomoifo - A principal in the late 1980s to early 1990s (1988–1991), was transferred to Edo State immediately after the creation of Delta State in 1991.
 Dr. Joseph Anidu Egenege - A principal in the early 1990s immediately after the creation of Delta State from Bendel State, later Associate Professor of Health Education, Dept of Public and Community Health, Novena University, Ogume, Delta State, Nigeria.
 Mr. J. M. Edah
 Mr. Ikimi
 Rev. T. U. Aliagba
 Mrs. Omabegho
 Mr. Peter Okotie
 Mr. Hendrix O. O. Ajuyah 
 Chuks

Notable teachers 
 Dr. Alex Ekwueme - Former vice president of Nigeria who was Physics Master between 1950 and 1952.
 C. O. Lawson - Who later became permanent secretary and secretary to the Federal Government.
 Justice Victor Ovie Whisky - A jurist who served as a Chief Judge of the Benin High Court in the late 1970s and later as the chairman of the Federal Electoral Commission (FEDECO) from 1980–1983.
 Justice S. A. Ajuyah - Who was an English teacher.
 Professor Eskor Toyor - Marxist economist
 Professor S.I.M. Ogwo
 Dr. U. U. Udoh
 Dr. J. B. Akingba
 Nze Sam Onyewuenyi.
 Abel Guobadia - Former Independent National Electoral Commission (INEC) Chairman, Commissioner for Education and later Commissioner for Finance in the former Bendel State (now Edo and Delta) between 1979 and 1983.
 Chief (Mrs.) Betty Efekodha - Hon. Commissioner, Ministry Of Women Affairs, Community and Social Development, taught Literature in English and English Language.
 Mrs. A.N Okocha. Seasoned teacher, she taught so many years in the school, from Yoruba as a national language far back in 1988 to social studies and History in the 90s and a strong disciplinarian
 Mrs. Igbesoko, The famous Geography teacher that taught SS1 students Geography in the 90s, she retired in 1997
 Mrs. E.C. Pillai - Health Sciences teacher, 1961–1965
 Mr. M.G. Philipos - Vice-Principal and Head of the Department of Chemistry, 1968–1986
 Mrs. A.O. Philipos - Head of the Department of Mathematics, 1971–1986
 Mr. T.D. Cherian - Vice-Principal and Head of the Department of Physics, 1969–1987
 Mrs. Cherian - Mathematics teacher, 1973–1987
 Mr. Anthony Gogo Agbasoga- Notable French teacher. Nana House Master.
 Ms. Catherine Onoriose - French teacher
 Mrs. Agbam - Home Economics teacher
 Mr. Ajah -
 Mrs. Dorus F- Fine Art teacher
 Mrs. Roli Uduaghan (née Touyo) Former student and Home Economics Teacher
 Mr. VRC Nwokocha VP Admin
 Mr. Onwuamaeze (Coach Physical Education teacher) Late

Notable alumni
The role call of old students who have passed through the school attests the fact that the ideas of the founding fathers have not been in vain. Some notable old students have passed through the school and made their mark in different walks of life.

The list of the Hussey's old students who have distinguished themselves in national service confirms that the school was indeed a breeding ground for future leaders. These include:

Politics, Law and Government 
 Brigadier General Mobolaji Johnson - Former Military Governor of Lagos State attended Hussey College from 1952 to 1954.
 Brigadier Bassey Asuquo - Former Military Governor of Delta and Edo states.
 Navy Commander Temi Ejoor - Former military Administrator of Enugu and Abia States.
 Brigadier General Sunday Tuoyo (rtd.) - Former Military Governor of old Ondo State.
 Chief Isaac O. Jemide - Former member of the House of Assembly in then Bendel State (1978–1983)and appointed a Chief of the Warri Kingdom in 1985.
 Mr Emmanuel Ogidi - Former Chairman of Peoples Democratic Party (PDP) in Delta State.
 Justice Okunegha Akhigbe - Former Chief Judge of Edo State.
 Justice Ogbodu Awala.
 Justice Alfred Awala - Retired Justice of the Court of Appeal, Enugu, Former Secretary NBA Lagos Branch, attended Hussey College from 1957-1960, 
 Hon. B. I. Obasuyi - Former Attorney-General of Bendel State.
 General Osio Obada (rtd) - One time Federal Minister of Works.
Hon. Comrade Godwin Okeke (JP),a notable person, known for his achievement in Civil Service, NLC and Trade unions, in Anambra State. One time National Chairman Public Service Negotiating Council and member representing Anambra State in National Labour Advisory Council. Attended Hussey College from 1953 to 1958. Then attended Oxford University, Wales, London, where he studied Industrial Relations and Labour Administration.  
 Mrs. Sheila Roli Uduaghan, First Lady of Delta State - A former Home Economics teacher at Hussey College from 1984 to 1996 and also an old student.
 Dr Jackson Gaius-Obaseki - Former Managing Director of the Nigeria National Petroleum Corporation (NNPC), was in Hussey College from 1962 to 1969.

Science, Technology, Engineering and Medicine 
 Dr (Mrs) A. S. Lawani-Osunde of the Orthopaedic Hospital, Igbobi.
 Late Dr Tunde Obanor - Medical Practitioner notable for his contribution to the Nigerian Medical Association and social activist.
 Dr Richmond S. Leigh, former governorship aspirant of Delta State, founder of Lily Clinic Warri, and Senior Pastor Father's House Bible Church, Warri

Military Personnel 
 Rear Admiral Festus Porbeni - Former Chief of Administration, Defence Headquarters and Minister of Transport, was at Hussey College between 1959 and 1964.
 Major General Obada Orho Eso (Rtd), OFR, JSSC - He was former National Vice-President, Hussey College Old Student Association;  attended Hussey College between 1953–58; Federal Commissioner for Works (1976–77) and Federal Commissioner, RMAFC (Revenue Mobilisation Allocation and Fiscal Commission) in May 2005.
 Navy Captain Babatunde Adedimeji (Rtd.) - Chairman, Technical Director, Nigeria Amateur Weightlifting Federation and also the president, Institute of Sales and Marketing Management of Nigeria (ISMMN), attended Hussey College between 1966 and 1971.
 Major Isaac Jasper Adaka Boro - Scientist, academic, administrator, soldier to the core and Niger Delta Nationalist. He attended Hussey College, passed the West African School Certificate Examinations in 1957 and produced the best school certificate result for the college in that year.

Academia 
 Professor Samuel Tunde Bajah - Renowned chemistry teacher, lecturer and also a former teacher at Hussey College. He attended Hussey College between 1949 and 1954, and was in the school's athletic team that won the Grier Cup in 1954.

Entertainment 
 Emmanuel France - Nollywood actor, was in Hussey College from 1958 to 1962.

Monarchs 
Hussey College has been the grooming and breeding ground for Kings, Queens, Princes, Princesses, Royal Fathers and Traditional Rulers etc. The lists of Traditional Rulers who passed through Hussey College are:
 Oba Tijani Akinloye, OON, Sateru II, - Ojomu of Ajiranland, Eti-Osa, Lagos State who was a student at the school between 1958 and 1962 and his wife, Olori Bolaji Aderibigbe Akinloye who was among the first set of girls admitted into Hussey College in 1960.
 Ogiame Atuwatse II, CON, - The Olu of Warri, attended Hussey College between 1961 and 1967.
 Oba Frederick Adegunle Aroloye, OFR, Gbolagunte Arubiefen IV - The Owa of Idanreland, Ondo State who was a student at the school between 1951 and 1954.
 Chief Anselem Edonogie - The Enogie of Uromi, Edo State.
 The late Chief David Imadojemu – Enogie of Igueben, Edo State, he was the first monarch to pass through Hussey College.

Sports Personalities 
Hussey College almost from inception became a centre for sporting excellence, raising great sportsmen and women who represented Nigeria at international meets and competitions and this was attributable to the indefatigable O.N. Rewane.
Hussey College was a major force in athletics as the school dominated the Grier Cup competition for secondary schools in the then Western Region as well as the Hussey Shield competition and Principal's Cup. Some notable Hussey College great sportsmen are:
 Daniel Okwudili - Great footballer and regular in the national football team in the 1950s.
 Patrick Nequakpo - Great footballer and regulars in the national football team in the 1950s.
 Thompson Usiyan - Who was a member of the nation's football team, the Green Eagles.
 Clement Temile - Who was a member of the nation's football team, the Green Eagles.
 Tony Urhobo - Former national pole vault record holder and Director of Sports in Delta State.
 Franklyn Howard - Green Eagles
 Fuludu George - Green Eagles
 Dr Omawumi Evelyn Atsiangbe-Urhobo (niece of Tony Urhobo) - An Astute Diplomat, humanitarian, Philanthropist and former junior national 100 and 200 metres champion. She also represented Nigeria in various international competitions, including the Commonwealth Games in Edinburg, Scotland, in 1970. For her excellent sporting activities, she was inducted into the University of Lagos Sports Hall of Fame in 2005.

Hussey College Old Students Association Ex Officio 
 Mr. Ben Eke, a former director in the Federal Ministry of Information who is also former National President of Hussey College Warri Old Students Association.
 Emmanuel Efeni - Former Assistant National Publicity Secretary Hussey College Old Student Association.

References 

Secondary schools in Nigeria
Education in Delta State
Educational institutions established in 1947
1947 establishments in Nigeria